Primula hendersonii is a species of flowering plant in the family Primulaceae, native to western North America, from California north to southern British Columbia and Idaho. Common names include broad-leaved shooting star, Henderson's shooting star, mosquito bills, and sailor caps.

Description
P. hendersonii is summer deciduous, dying back to the ground after the rains cease. It has basal clumps of leaves, 2–16 cm, with nodding flowers 6–25 mm long on stems 10–30 cm tall. The flowers are magenta to deep lavender to white, with the stamens thrust out and the sepals bent back. It is highly variable and hybridizes with Primula clevelandii, from which it can be distinguished by its reddish or purplish stem.

Distribution and habitat
In California, it occurs in the northwest (except the north coast), the Cascade Range, the Sierra Nevada foothills, the Central Valley, the San Francisco Bay Area, the north Inner South Coast Ranges, and the San Bernardino Mountains. It is generally found in open woodlands, from sea level in British Columbia, up to  altitude in California.

Cultivation
It needs good drainage, and needs a dry summer period. Plants germinated from seed may take 3–5 years to produce flowers. For some plants, with frequent light fertilization and moisture, dormancy may be delayed, and flowering time may be decreased to 1–2 years. Another technique to speed flowering is to place them in a cooler after dormancy, then bring them to a shadehouse in midsummer. It can be propagated by division in winter. It prefers shade when inland.

Uses
The leaves and roots can be eaten when roasted or boiled, but are reported to be poisonous when eaten raw.

References

Notes

Jepson Flora Project: Dodecatheon hendersonii
Plants of British Columbia: Dodecatheon hendersonii

ITIS 23962
Cullina, William, and Cullina, Bill (2000) The New England Wild Flower Society Guide to Growing and Propagating Wildflowers of the United States and Canada, Houghton Mifflin Company, .
Las Pilitas Incredible Edibles
"Wildflowers of Henry W. Coe State Park" brochure, Larry Ulrich, 2002

hendersonii
Flora of California
Flora of the Sierra Nevada (United States)
Flora of the Western United States
Flora of the Northwestern United States
Flora of British Columbia
Natural history of the California chaparral and woodlands
Natural history of the California Coast Ranges
Natural history of the San Francisco Bay Area
Flora without expected TNC conservation status